Randy Mearns (born May 28, 1969) is a former lacrosse player and the current head coach of the St. Bonaventure Bonnies men’s lacrosse team. After a 9-year career in the National Lacrosse League, Mearns became the head coach of the Canisius Golden Griffins men’s lacrosse team, where he would coach for 19 seasons before leaving in 2017 to coach for the newly-created lacrosse program at St. Bonaventure.

Mearns, along with the entire 2006 Canadian National lacrosse team, was inducted into the Canadian Lacrosse Hall of Fame, following a lengthy career in the Ontario Lacrosse Association, Major Series Lacrosse and Western Lacrosse Association Canadian professional box lacrosse leagues as a player.

Canadian Box Career
Mearns played for the St. Catharines Athletics for 5 years. In 1990, Mearns led the team to their first Minto Cup championship since 1950, and was awarded the "Jim McConaghy Memorial Cup" for Minto Cup M.V.P. He was later given the "B.W. Evans Award" for Top Graduating Player. Mearns ranked 36th all time in Canadian Junior A lacrosse assists (regular season and playoffs combined) with 348.

With the Brampton Excelsiors, Mearns won Mann Cup championships in 1992 and 1993, and also won three with the Six Nation Chiefs (’94, ‘95’ ’96).

College career
Mearns was an All-American NCAA lacrosse player at Canisius College from 1990 to 1992 who is currently 20th all-time in Division I career points-per-game (PPG), having scored 95 goals and 95 assists for 190 career points in 39 games. He is also the all-time leading scorer at Canisius.

Professional career
Mearns played professionally for the NLL's Buffalo Bandits and Rochester Knighthawks, acting as captain of the 1997 NLL champion Knighthawk team. Rochester also played in the 1995, 1999 and 2000 finals. Since his retirement from professional lacrosse, he has served as the color commentator for the Bandits' radio broadcasts alongside play-by-play man John Gurtler.

Coaching career
He coached the Canisius men's lacrosse team through 2017, and also was an assistant coach on the Canadian national team that won the gold medal at the 2006 World Lacrosse Championship. Mearns won 94 games in his 18 years of coaching at Canisius, and led the Griffins to their first ever NCAA tournament bid in 2008 where they lost to Syracuse in the first round, and second in 2012 where they lost against Loyola in the first round. Mearns has provided development for his players towards the professional ranks, including Mark Miyashita who graduated from Canisius in 2003 and was the first overall selection in the 2003 National Lacrosse League draft. In a preseason coaches poll, Canisius was picked to repeat in 2009 as MAAC champions. However after a rough start to the season where they lost six straight including 3 one-goal losses, the Griffs ended 2009 on a 4 and 3 run.

Mearns was Head Coach of the Canadian national team that won the gold medal at the 2014 World Lacrosse Championship.

Mearns was named the initial head coach for the St. Bonaventure men's Division I lacrosse team, in June 2017.

Head coaching record

Statistics

NLL

__

OLA

__

Canisius College

 (a) 20th in NCAA career points-per-game

See also
NCAA Men's Division I Lacrosse Records
World Lacrosse Championship

References

External links
Canisius U Web Site
Team Canada Men's Lacrosse
NLL Career Stats page
Laxpower.com article on Canadian Hall of Fame Induction

1969 births
Living people
Buffalo Bandits players
Canadian lacrosse players
Canisius Golden Griffins men's lacrosse coaches
Canisius Golden Griffins men's lacrosse players
Lacrosse people from Ontario
Rochester Knighthawks players
Sportspeople from St. Catharines
National Lacrosse League announcers